In Ancient Greek grammar, a barytone is a word without any accent on the last syllable. Words with an acute or circumflex on the second-to-last or third-from-last syllable are barytones, as well as words with no accent on any syllable:

τις 'someone' (unaccented)
ἄνθρωπος 'person' (proparoxytone)
μήτηρ 'mother' (paroxytone)
μοῦσα 'muse' (properispomenon)

Like the word baritone, it comes from Ancient Greek barýtonos, from barýs 'heavy; low' and tónos 'pitch; sound'.

See also
Ultima (linguistics)
Pitch accent

References
Herbert Weir Smyth. Greek Grammar. paragraph 158.

Phonology
Greek grammar
Ancient Greek